Lomeh Daraq is a village in Abish Ahmad Rural District, Abish Ahmad District, Kaleybar County, East Azerbaijan Province, Iran. At the 2006 census, its population was 765, in 162 families.

References 

Populated places in Kaleybar County